Miroslav Lacek (born 16 April 1959) is a Czech former professional tennis player.

Lacek was born in Kadaň, a town in modern day Czech Republic, where his father Jiří worked as a physical education teacher and was instrumental in the establishment of the Kadaň Tennis Association.

As a junior, Lacek represented the Czechoslovakia national team alongside Ivan Lendl, including at a youth World Cup event in Caracas and the 1979 Galea Cup in Vichy, finishing second in the latter.

In the 1980s he competed on the professional tour and reached a career high singles ranking of 170 in the world, with runner-up finishes in two ATP Challenger Tour tournaments. He made the occasional Grand Prix main draw appearance and was a bronze medalist in doubles at the Friendship Games in 1984.

References

External links
 
 

1959 births
Living people
Czechoslovak male tennis players
Czech male tennis players
People from Kadaň
Friendship Games medalists in tennis
Sportspeople from the Ústí nad Labem Region